The  (museum of communication) was a museum related to telecommunication and postal service in Hamburg, Germany. It was closed to visitors on 19 October 2009 and was liquidated afterwards.

The collection placed emphasis on the difficulties of communication at sea, the museum participated in the Long Night of Museums.

See also

 List of museums and cultural institutions in Hamburg

References

External links

 Website. Retrieved on 2009-10-30. 

Museums in Hamburg
Buildings and structures in Hamburg-Mitte
Telecommunications museums
Defunct museums in Germany
Hamburg